A trans man is a man who was assigned female at birth. The label of transgender man is not always interchangeable with that of transsexual man, although the two labels are often used in this way. Transgender is an umbrella term that includes different types of gender variant people (including transsexual people). Trans men have a male gender identity, and many trans men choose to undergo surgical or hormonal transition, or both (see sex reassignment therapy), to alter their appearance in a way that aligns with their gender identity or alleviates gender dysphoria.

Although the literature indicates that most trans men identify as heterosexual (meaning they are sexually attracted to women), trans men, like cisgender men, can have any sexual orientation or sexual identity, and some trans men might consider conventional sexual orientation labels inadequate or inapplicable to them, in which case they may elect to use labels like queer.

Terminology 

The umbrella term  is a shortening of both transgender and transsexual, and describes anyone whose gender identity does not align with their assigned sex. Trans men who transition are commonly referred to as female-to-male (FTM or F2M).

The term transsexual originated in the medical and psychological communities, and is generally considered a subset of transgender, although the two are not always interchangeable. It predominantly describes people with medically diagnosed gender dysphoria, and who desire to permanently transition to the opposite sex via sex reassignment therapy. Many trans people prefer the labels transgender or trans, considering them more inclusive and less stigmatizing. However, others, such as Buck Angel, reject the label of transgender. The GLAAD media reference guide advises against describing people as transsexual, except for individuals who explicitly identify as such.

Transmasculine (sometimes clipped to ) is a broader term for all trans individuals with predominantly masculine identities or gender expression, and includes trans men as well as non-binary people who were assigned female at birth and may have a identity that is partially masculine but not entirely male.

The alternate spelling  is sometimes used interchangeably. However, like , it is often associated with trans-exclusionary views which hold that trans men are distinct from men, and thus require a separate word to describe them. For this reason many transgender people find the spelling offensive.

Transitioning 

Originally, the term trans men referred specifically to female-to-male transsexual people who underwent hormone replacement therapy (HRT) or sex reassignment surgery (SRS), or both. The definition of transition has broadened to include theories of psychological development or complementary methods of self-acceptance. Many of those who identify as transgender may face gender dysphoria.

Transsexual and transgender men may seek medical interventions such as hormones and surgery to make their bodies as congruent as possible with their gender presentation. However, many transgender and transsexual men cannot afford or choose not to undergo surgery or hormone replacement therapy.

Many who have not undergone top surgery choose to bind their breasts. There are a few different methods of binding, including using sports bras and specially made binders (which can be vest-type, or wrap-around style). Tape or bandages are often depicted in popular culture.

Some trans men might also decide to pack, to create a phallic bulge in the crotch of clothing. However, this is not universal. Trans men who decide to pack may use anything from rolled up socks to specially made packers, which resemble a penis. Some packers are also created for trans men to be able to urinate through them (stand-to-pee, or STP, devices), or for sexual penetration or other sexual activity (known as "pack-and-play").

Transitioning might involve some or all of the following steps:
 Social transition: using a preferred name and pronouns, wearing clothing seen as gender appropriate, disclosure to family, friends and usually at the workplace/school.
 Sex reassignment therapy: hormone replacement therapy (HRT), and/or surgery (SRS)
 Legal affirmation: name and (sometimes) sex marker correction in legal identification documents.

Being socially accepted as male (sometimes known as passing) may be challenging for trans men who have not undergone HRT and/or surgery. Some trans men may choose to present as female in certain social situations (e.g. at work). After physical transition, trans men usually live full-time as male. However, some transmasculine individuals might choose to use and engage their bodies to be pregnant, birth a baby, and breastfeed.

Prevalence, identity and relationships

In the United States, the ratio of trans men within the general population is unclear, but estimates range between 1:2,000 and 1:100,000.  A U.S. Census Bureau study in 2015 suggests that there were around 58,000 name changes in census records consistent with female to male transitions although only 7,500 of these changed their sex coding as well.

In a study by Kara Devaney, entitled Transgender Research Literature Review, it is addressed that the term transgender encompasses a myriad of different and unique identities that do not follow the "normal" rules of gender. Miriam J. Abelson writes, "There is no question that trans men's experiences are men's
experiences and give insight about men, masculinity, and gender inequality."

Like cisgender men, trans men can have any sexual orientation or sexual identity, including heterosexual, gay, bisexual, and queer, and some trans men consider conventional sexual orientation labels inadequate or inapplicable to them. The literature commonly indicates that sexual attraction to those of their same gender (e.g., trans men liking men and trans women liking women) is considerably less common among trans men than among trans women; the vast majority of trans men are reported as heterosexual. Surveys from the National Center for Transgender Equality show more variation in sexual orientation or sexual identity among trans men. In NCTE's 2015 Transgender Survey of respondents who identified as trans men, 23% identified as heterosexual or straight. The vast majority (65%) identified their sexual orientation or sexual identity as queer (24%), pansexual (17%), bisexual (12%), or gay/same-gender loving (12%).

Some trans men date heterosexual women, while other trans men date queer-identified women; the latter might be because queer-identified women are less invested in the gender and sexual anatomy of a person when it comes to selecting an intimate partner. It is also common for trans men to have histories with the lesbian community or to feel that they identify better with that community because of its wide acceptance of gender variance, with a number of trans men having identified as lesbian (often as a "butch lesbian") before realizing that they are instead transgender.

Trans men have less success integrating socially within cisgender gay men's communities, which tend to be more body-focused, especially in terms of being phallocentric. Yitzchak et al. state that, as a result, they more commonly see gay trans men partnering with each other than with cisgender gay men. There are, however, cases of women being likelier than men to thoroughly question trans men about their motivations for modifying their bodies.

Some scholars argue against assumptions that trans men are predominantly heterosexual and usually have lesbian histories. In scholars Dan Irving and Rupert Raj's book Trans Activism in Canada, researchers state, "There is still a common misperception that trans men are largely heterosexual amongst those who conflate gender identity and sexual orientation. It is frequently assumed that trans men are exclusively attracted to women and have lesbian histories prior to transition." They add, "Recent data from the Trans PULSE project (Bauer, Redman, Bradley, & Scheim, 2013) challenge this assumption, with 63 percent of female-to-male spectrum trans people in Ontario reporting non-heterosexual identities and/or past-year sex with trans or non-trans men." They also argue that, based on some research, "many non-trans gay men have welcomed trans men into gay communities and have increasingly recognized trans men as potential sexual and romantic partners."

Health 

Trans men and transmasculine people often face difficulty and discrimination receiving medical treatment, due to both bias against assigned-female patients and against transgender people. In the 2015 U.S. Transgender Survey, 42% of 8,037 trans men reported negative experiences with healthcare providers. There is a lack of credible research about how to provide adequate healthcare to transmasculine people undergoing medical transition, notably with doctors having difficulty diagnosing breast cancer in people who have undergone top surgery. HIV infection between trans men and others is still increasing.

Some trans experience menstruation or choose to become pregnant.  This depends on what decisions they make regarding hormones and surgery. According to surveys compiled by Medicare for Australia, 75 male-identifying parents gave birth in Australia in 2016, and 40 in 2017.

Discrimination 

Transgender men can face discrimination as a result of their status as trans men. Such discrimination may include sexual violence.

See also 
 Trans woman
 List of transgender people
 List of transgender-related topics

Notes

References

Further reading 
 Becoming a Visible Man by Jamison Green
 Just Add Hormones: An Insider's Guide to the Transsexual Experience by Matt Kailey
 Transmen and FTMs: Identities, Bodies, Genders, and Sexualities by Jason Cromwell
 FTM: Female-to-Male Transsexuals in Society. by Aaron H. Devor
 Second Son: Transitioning Toward My Destiny, Love and Life by Ryan Sallans

External links 
 
 Medical Therapy and Health Maintenance for Transgender Men: A Guide For Health Care Providers free ebook, 
 TransGuys.com A magazine for trans men
 FTM International An organization serving the female-to-male trans community.
 Original Plumbing magazine Quarterly magazine with online component focusing on culture and diversity in the trans male community.

 
Terms for men
Transgender identities

sv:FtM